Skora Building, also known as the Budlock Building, was a historic commercial building located in downtown Evansville, Indiana, USA. It was built between 1911 and 1913 and was a two-story, rectangular brick building. It was demolished on January 26, 2006

It was listed on the National Register of Historic Places in 1982 and delisted in 2009.

References

Former National Register of Historic Places in Indiana
Commercial buildings on the National Register of Historic Places in Indiana
Commercial buildings completed in 1913
Buildings and structures in Evansville, Indiana
National Register of Historic Places in Evansville, Indiana